The Laguna copperplate inscription (literal translation: Inscription on flattened copper of Laguna) is an official acquittance inscribed onto a copper plate in the Shaka year 822 (Gregorian A.D. 900). It is the earliest known calendar-dated document found within the Philippine Islands.

The plate was found in 1989 by a labourer near the mouth of the Lumbang River in Wawa, Lumban, Laguna in the Philippines. The inscription was mainly written in Old Malay using the Early Kawi script with a number of technical Sanskrit words and Old Javanese or Old Tagalog honorifics. After it was found, the text was first translated in 1991 by Antoon Postma, a Dutch anthropologist and Hanunó'o script researcher.

The inscription documents the existence and names of several surrounding states as of A.D. 900, such as the Tagalog city-state of Tondo. Some historians associate the toponym Medang in this inscription with reference to the Medang palace in Java at that time, although the name is a common vocabulary of Malayo-Polynesian origin.

Historic context 

Prior to the European colonial era, South East Asia were under the Indosphere of greater India, where numerous Indianized principalities and empires flourished for several centuries in what are now Thailand, Indonesia, Malaysia, Singapore, Philippines, Cambodia and Vietnam. The influence of Indian culture into these areas was given the term indianization. French archaeologist George Coedes defined it as the expansion of an organized culture that was framed upon Indian originations of royalty, Hinduism and Buddhism and the Sanskrit dialect. This can be seen in the Indianization of Southeast Asia, the spread of Hinduism and the transmission of Buddhism. Indian diaspora, both ancient (PIO) and current (NRI), played an ongoing key role as professionals, traders, priests and warriors. Indian honorifics also influenced the Malay, Thai, Filipino and Indonesian honorifics.

The pre-colonial native Filipino script called Baybayin, known in Visayan as badlit, as kur-itan/kurditan in Ilocano and as kulitan in Kapampangan, was itself derived from the Brahmic scripts of India. Its use was recorded in the 16th century by Miguel López de Legazpi.

Discovery

The Laguna Copperplate Inscription was found in 1987 near the mouth of the Lumbang River near Laguna de Bay, by a man named Ernesto Legisma who was dredging sand to turn into concrete. Suspecting that the artifact might have some value, the man sold it to an antique dealer who, having found no buyers, eventually sold it to the National Museum of the Philippines, where it was assigned to Alfredo E. Evangelista, head of its anthropology department. The National Museum refers to the artifact as the Laguna Copper Plate.

A year later, Antoon Postma noted that the inscription was similar to the ancient Indonesian script of Kawi. Postma translated the script and found the document dated itself to the Saka year 822, an old Hindu calendar date which corresponds to the year 900. It is from about the same time as the mention of the Philippines in the official Chinese Song dynasty History of Song for the year 972.

Description
It differs in manufacture from Javanese scrolls of the period, which had the words inscribed onto a heated, softened metal scroll.

It records the date as the year 822 of the Saka era, the month of Waisaka, and the fourth day of the waning moon, which corresponds to Monday, 21 April 900 on the Julian calendar. The text is Old Malay with numerous loanwords from Sanskrit and a few non-Malay vocabulary elements whose origin may be Old Javanese. The Sanskrit words are used for technical terms, while the Javanese words are used for forms of address. The Old Malay it uses differs from examples found in Java and Sumatra. The document states that it releases its bearers, the children of Namwaran, from a debt in gold amounting to 1 kati and 8 suwarnas (865 grams; 27.8 troy ounces).

Text

Analysis
Postma, who first translated the Laguna Copperplate Inscription, suggested that the place names and personal names in the inscription needed to be carefully studied by scholars because "they furnish vital clues regarding the political and topographic background" of the world around the time of the inscription. He identified as toponyms the words Pailah, Tundun, Puliran and Binuangan''', and posited that Dewata and Medang could be either personal names or toponyms. Postma identified three of these toponyms, Binuangan, Pailah and Puliran, as Malayo-Polynesian in origin, and three other toponyms, Tundun, Dewata and Mdang, as being of Sanskrit origin.

After carefully considering possible interpretations of the text, including the possibility that Pailah and Puliran were located in the Laguna Lake region, Postma concluded that he was confident that Binuangan, Pailah, and Puliran "find their equivalents within the limited area of what is now known as Bulacan Province in the Philippines, [and that] the text of this same inscription can be considered to refer indeed to these places, already existing already under identical names in the tenth century". The text itself, however, being written in 900, was created in the ninth century.

 Toponyms as Bulacan settlements 
Postma emphasized  that his interpretation of the inscription placenames being in Bulacan puts these named settlements on key locations on Central Luzon's river systems, which he referred to as "waterhighways", which allowed "an effective (and often only) means of transportation and communication between the different settlements", as well as providing Chinese and Southeast Asian maritime traders easy access to interior trading centers via rivers. He also noted that Central Luzon's rivers were "much deeper and certainly were more navigable than they are today".

Postma's assertions have been challenged, notably by the Pila Historical Society Foundation and local historian Jaime F. Tiongson, but which have not been fully resolved by scholarly peer review.

 Words affirmed as toponyms 
Postma asserted that he was fairly certain that four words in the inscription were place names, or toponyms: "Pailah" (lines 4 and 6), "Tundun" (line 3), "Puliran" (line 6) and "Binuangan" (line 7).

 Tundun 
Tundun, whose name Postma believed to be "Sanskrit in origin", was referenced in line 3 of the inscription. It is the most easily recognizable of the toponyms identified by Postma in the inscription, and scholarly consensus generally agrees with Postma's original identification of the inscription's Tundun as Tondo, the polity located on the northern seaside of the Pasig River delta, where the Pasig River empties into Manila Bay.

Postma left an avenue for an alternative interpretation open however, saying that Mdang and Tondo "because of their lingual consonants (n and d) that are of Sanskrit origin might originally be toponyms existing on the Island of Java".

 Pailah 
Postma identified Pailah, whose name he believed to be Austronesian in origin, as a "locality with its own leader". It was referenced twice, in lines 4 and 6 of the inscription. Locating its possible location in Bulacan, Postma proposed its site to be "the village of Paila, in Barangay of San Lorenzo at the eastern part of the municipality of Norzagaray, with coordinates 14–54.5 & 121-06.9". However, it might also referred to the Pailaha region part of North Sulawesi province located in the northern Sulawesi.

 Puliran 
Postma identified Puliran, whose name he believed to be Austronesian in origin, as a "locality with its own leader" referenced in line 6 of the inscription. Postma asserted that  Puliran was probably located in modern-day Bulacan, on the current site of "Pulilan, along the Angat River (pronounced: Anggat) north of Manila, (coordinates: 14–54.2 & 120-50.8)".

 Binuangan 
Postma believed that the place-name of Binuangan, referenced in line 7 of the inscription as a locality with its own leader, was Austronesian in origin. Locating its possible location in Bulacan, Postma proposed its site to be "the village of Binuangan, belonging to the municipality of Obando, situated at the mouth of the Bulacan River, with coordinates 14–43.2 & 120–543".

 Inscription words believed to be possible place-names 
Based on linguistic analysis, Postma concluded that the words Dewata and Mdang "could be either personal names or toponyms". He noted that their names seemed to be Sanskrit in origin, but did not go into a deep discussion of where they might have been located, other than to say Mdang was already known as a place name in Indonesia.
Abinales and Amoroso (2005) note that the leaders of Dewata and Mdang (if these words are indeed to be accepted as toponyms) were not present for the transaction but were rather invoked as authorities in certifying the cancellation of the debt in question: "Jayadewa invokes the authority of the chief of Dewata, who in turn represents the chief of Medang".

 Mdang 
Postma's paper proposing his translation and interpretation of the inscription mentions that his search of the Indonesian toponym listings developed by Damais and Darmosoetopo, as well as his consultation with the 14th Congress of the Indo-Pacific Prehistory Association (IPPA) in August 1990, determined that Mdang was the only (possible) toponym in the inscription which matched with known Indonesian place-names.

Abinales and Amoroso (2005), citing Patanñe (1996) note that this seems to refer to "a temple complex in Java, where the kingdom of Mataram was a rival to Srivijaya".

 Dewata 
Scholars after Postma, such as Patanñe (1996) and Abinales and Amoroso (2005) have come to identify the Dewata of the inscription as a settlement in or near "present-day Mount Diwata, near Butuan".

While it is clear in the text of the inscription that Jayadewa of Tondo is invoking the authority of the Chief of Dewata, the precise relationship between Dewata and Mdang is less clear.  E.P. Patanñe notes: "This relationship is unclear but a possible explanation is that the chief of Dewata wanted it to be known that he had a royal connection in Java."

 Other proposed interpretations of toponyms 
Postma's assertions regarding the exact locations of Pailah and Puliran and Binuangan have been challenged by the Pila Historical Society Foundation and local historian Jaime F. Tiongson, who assert that the place names Pailah and Puliran are more likely to refer to places close to where the plate was found – in Lumban – given that archeological findings in nearby Pila show the presence of an extensive settlement during precolonial times.

According to Tiongson's interpretation: Pailah refers to Pila; Puliran refers to Puliran, the old name of the territory that occupied the southeastern part of Laguna de Bay at the time; and Binuangan refers to modern day Barangay, Binawangan in Capalonga, Camarines Norte.

 Vocabularies 
The inscription contains a great amount of words derived from Sanskrit, starting with a line of astronomical terms that indicates the date of the inscription in detail. It also has some Old Javanese and Old Tagalog words expressing ceremonious forms of address. However, the main language of the inscription is Old Malay, which served as lingua franca or trade language of the whole archipelago during those times. The most significant indication of Old Malay features are found in verbal affixes used in the inscription, e.g.: bar-, di-, dipar-, which correspond to ber-, di-, and diper- respectively in modern Malay and Indonesian. Old Malay words and their modern Malay and Indonesian counterparts are listed below, followed by their English gloss:

  = sana = there
  = tatkala = while, during
  = dayang (also used in Tag.) = court maiden
  = lawan (Tag. cognate is ) = counterpart
  = dengan = with
  = -nya = his / her / its (possessive suffix)
  = sanak = relative, kindred
  = anak (also used in Tag.) = child
  = beri (Tag. cognate is ) = give
  = oleh = by, from
 ,  = di = at, in, of
  = jadi = become
  = tuan = leader, master
  = sudah = already
  = lepas (Tag. cognate is ) = unbounded, escaped
  = hutang (Tag. cognate is ) = debt
  = hadapan (borrowed into Tag. as ) = in front
  = tetapi = but
  = sadanya (preserved in Minangkabau) = whole, all
  = dari = from
  = bakti = dedication, devotion
  = hulun (Classical Mal.) = slave, subject
  = makanya = therefore
  = cucu = grandchild
  = diperhabis = cleared
  = ini = this
  =  (Classical Mal.) = perchance
  = hari = day
  = kemudian = afterwards, later
  = ada = exist, there is
  = orang = person, people
  =  (Classical Mal.) = state, say, utter
  = belum = not yet

Aside from the Sanskrit and Old Malay words, there occur also some pure Old Javanese words that have no cognates in Old Malay, or at least, have not been found in other Old Malay inscriptions, like ngaran (name) and pamegat (leader, chief). In an Old Malay inscription, one would expect barnama instead of barngaran because nama is the Sanskrit-derived word for 'name' in Old and Modern Malay. Pamegat is another Old Javanese word that frequently occurs in Old Javanese inscriptions, but not in Old Malay ones. It is often preceded by honorific sang as in the inscription. These words are accepted as Old Javanese words, but could be Old Tagalog as well, because they exist in both of these languages.

Significance
The Laguna Copperplate Inscription, among other recent finds such as the Golden Tara of Butuan and 14th century pottery and gold jewellery in Cebu, is highly important in revising  ancient Philippine history, which was until then considered by some Western historians to be culturally isolated from the rest of Asia, as no evident pre-Hispanic written records were found at the time. Philippine historian William Henry Scott debunked these theories in 1968 with his Prehispanic Source materials for the Study of Philippine History which was subsequently published in 1984. The locations mentioned are all near rivers, suggesting Old Malay may have come to the area along trade networks.

The inscription is a document demonstrative of pre-Hispanic literacy and culture, and is considered to be a national treasure. It is currently deposited at the National Museum of Anthropology in Manila.

It is the earliest document that shows the use of mathematics in precolonial Philippine societies. A standard system of weights and measures is demonstrated by the use of precise measurement for gold, and familiarity with rudimentary astronomy is shown by fixing the precise day within the month in relation to the phases of the moon.

Cultural references

The inscription shows heavy Sanskrit and Old Javanese linguistic influences. Among the observations made by Antonio Pigafetta in the 16th century Boxer Codex was that Old Malay had currency amongst classical period Filipinos as a lingua franca''. The Golden Tara statue, an ancient artifact discovered in Butuan, Agusan del Norte, dates from the same period and strongly suggests the presence of Hindu-Buddhist beliefs prior to the introduction (and subsequent subscription) to Roman Catholicism and Islam amongst Filipinos.

Other inscriptions from nearby regions
These inscriptions are all from the province of Central Java, Indonesia (excepting the Kalasan inscription which is in the adjacent Special Region of Yogyakarta).
Canggal inscription (732)
Kalasan inscription (778)
Kelurak inscription (782)
Karangtengah inscription (824)
Tri Tepusan inscription (842)
Shivagrha inscription (856)
Mantyasih inscription (907)

See also

 Related topics
 Buddhism in the Philippines
 Indonesian Esoteric Buddhism
 Indosphere
 Indian cultural influences in early Philippine polities
 Hinduism in Philippines
 List of India-related topics in the Philippines
 Golden Tara
 Tabon Caves Garuda Gold Pendant
 Suyat
 Other similar topics
 Copperplate
 Early Indian epigraphy
 History of the Philippines
 History of India
 Indian copper plate inscriptions
 Indian inscriptions
 Tamil Copper-plate inscriptions
 Outline of ancient India
 Vatteluttu

References

External links

 Hector Santos' A Philippine Document from 900 A.D.
 Paul Morrow's THE LAGUNA COPPERPLATE INSCRIPTION
 Laguna Copperplate Inscription and the Route to Paracale
 Laguna Copperplate Inscription Purchase Story
 Information on the Laguna Copperplate Inscription with vocalisation

Archaeology of the Philippines
Primary sources for early Philippine history
Hinduism in the Philippines
900
History of the Philippines (900–1565)
Philippine scripts
Malay inscriptions
Collections of the National Museum of the Philippines
History of Laguna (province)
9th-century inscriptions
Copper objects
1989 archaeological discoveries